My Jesus I Love Thee is a poem written by William Ralph Featherston in 1864 when he was 16 years old, although one source says he could have been just 12 years old. The first two lines of this poem are nearly the same as a hymn written by Caleb J. Taylor, published in 1804; this hymn is used as the basis for the song Imandra by Ananias Davisson in the Supplement to the Kentucky Harmony in 1820, reprinted in Southern Harmony in 1835. There are other similarities between Featherston's poem and camp-meeting songs published in the 1820s onward.

In 1876 Adoniram Gordon added music to Featherston's poem. Featherston died at the age of 27, well before his poem had become a well-known inspirational hymn. The poem is believed to have been his only publicly published work.

Inspiration
According to Tim Challies,
Not much is known about Featherston, except that he attended a Methodist church in Montreal, that he was young when he wrote the poem (12 or 16 years old), and that he died at just 27 years of age. One story about how the poem became public is that Featherston mailed it to his aunt in Los Angeles who, upon reading it, quickly sought its publication... It wasn't until several years after Featherston's death that Adoniram Judson Gordon (founder of Gordon College and Gordon-Conwell Theological Seminary) added a melody and published it in his book of hymns, thus forever transforming this poem to a song.

The United Methodist Church's Hymns of the United Methodist Church, a guide to the denomination's hymnal, states that Featherstone was 16 years old when he wrote the text in 1864. Kenneth Osbeck writes of this hymn in his book, 101 More Hymn Stories: "It is difficult to realize that this beloved devotional hymn, which expresses so profoundly a believer's love and gratitude to Christ ... was written by a teenager".

Notable recordings

 Amy Grant recorded a version of the song for her 2002 studio album Legacy... Hymns and Faith that was later included on her 2015 compilation album Be Still and Know... Hymns & Faith.
 Paul Baloche performed the song in a various artist album, Hymns 4 Worship, Vol. 2: Just As I Am which was released in 2005.
 Selah recorded a three-stanza version of the song in their 2009 album, You Deliver Me.
 In 2013, Darlene Zschech, along with Michael W. Smith, recorded an extra verse to this on the live worship DVD, Revealing Jesus.

References

Additional Sources
Reynolds, William Jensen. Hymns of Our Faith. Nashville, Tennessee: Broadman Press, 1964. (p. 291)
Taylor, Gordon Harry. Companion to the Song Book of the Salvation Army. St. Albans, England: The Campfield Press, 1988. (p. 300)
Center for Church Music

American Christian hymns
Canadian poems
1864 songs
Songs about Jesus